Adriana Muñoz may refer to:
 Adriana Muñoz (politician), Chilean sociologist and politician 
 Adriana Muñoz (athlete), Cuban middle-distance runner
 Adriana Ozores Muñoz, Spanish actress